Coimbatore Institute of Technology (CIT) is a government-aided autonomous engineering college located in Coimbatore, Tamil Nadu, India. It was founded in 1956 by V. Rangaswamy Naidu Educational Trust. It is affiliated to Anna University.

History
Coimbatore Institute of Technology was founded in the year 1956 by V.Rangaswamy Naidu Educational Trust (VRET). Sri.R.Venkataswamy Naidu, Prof.P.R.Ramakrishnan are the Founders of Coimbatore Institute of Technology. Sri.R.Venkataswamy Naidu was the Founder Correspondent from 1956 to 1994. Prof.P.R.Ramakrishnan was the Principal from 1956 to 1981 and the Correspondent from 1994 to 2008. Sri.R.Venkataswamy Naidu did his Textile Engineering from The University of Manchester, England. Prof.P.R.Ramakrishnan did his Electrical Engineering from Massachusetts Institute of Technology (MIT).

The philanthropic founders envisioned a unique professional learning order with special prominence on industrial training. CIT was affiliated to Madras University from 1956 to 1980. In 1980, the Institute became affiliated to Bharathiar University and subsequently to Anna University in 2001. CIT is recognized by the All India Council for Technical Education. The Institute was granted autonomous status in 1987 and is accredited by the National Board of Accreditation.

Academics

CIT offers 9 Under Graduate Academic Programmes and 12 Post Graduate Academic Programmes in addition for M.S. and Ph.D. Research Programmes.

The CIT Sandwich Polytechnic College was started in 1961. Presently, 8 Engineering Diploma Programmes are offered by the polytechnic in various engineering disciplines. The National Board of Accreditation has accredited the Mechanical Engineering (Sandwich) and Mechanical Engineering diploma programmes.

Rankings

CIT is ranked 102 in the National Institutional Ranking Framework (NIRF) engineering ranking of 2021.

Student life

Students Union
The students union consists of 20 clubs which include arts, dramatics, muthamizh mandram (Tamil), film, karate, literary, music, nature, photography, quiz, Kalam Knowledge Club (KKC), space, sports, NSS, NCC, YRC, RSP, Entrepreneurship development cell, Women Empowerment Cell, YHAI and Rotaract.

All the branches of engineering, technology, and applied sciences run associations which organize technical meetings and symposia in their respective disciplines.

The Coimbatore Regional Centre of the Indian Institute of Chemical Engineers functions with its office at the Department of Chemical Engineering in the Institute.

The Coimbatore centre of the Indian Welding Society (IWS) has been functioning in the Institute since 2002 in the department of Mechanical Engineering.

A student branch of IEEE functions with its office in the Department of Electrical and Electronics Engineering in the Institute.

The Institute has facilities for ball badminton, basketball, cricket, football, hockey, tennikoit, tennis, and volleyball.

Computer Science Department

The department imparts world class training and research. The department provides state of the art computing facilities to the students. Graduates from the department are most wanted by both academia and corporates like Microsoft, Yahoo, IBM, Oracle, EMC2. All over the world, alumni of the department occupy top positions in both academia and industry especially one of the alumni occupies as Ambassador of India in Israel. Important research and technical patents are registered by our alumnus. The department has generated funds from various government organizations like AICTE, MHRD, and DST for promoting research activities and modernization. "CPBK"

The department has signed MOUs with companies such as Microsoft, EMC2, Robert Bosch and TCS. The objective of these MOUs is to bridge the gap between academia and industry scenario. Every year TCS recognizes department’s outstanding students by awarding “Best Student” and “Best Project” awards. The department and Oklahoma State University jointly organized and conducted an International Conference on Sensors, Security, Software and Intelligent Systems (ISSSIS 2009) during 8–10 January 2009.
Some of the major research areas which the faculty members and students working on are grid computing, cloud computing, wireless networks, database technologies, bioinformatics, image processing, software engineering data mining and web mining.

Interface

Interface, an inter-collegiate technical symposium, is conducted by the circuit branches of Coimbatore Institute of Technology. Interface is held for two days in the month of February every year and invites the university students across the country, helping the external university students to showcase their projects, present research papers, network with other university students and participate in various events on campus. This symposium is organized entirely by students—of various departments—from fund raising for the events to event management.

Technovation

It is a national level technical symposium by the Chemical, Civil and Mechanical engineering students conducted during September every year.

Cyber Fest

It is a National Level Student Technical Symposium organized by Department of Computer Applications Association during January every year
conducted By M.sc Software Engineering and M.C.A. Students.

Notable alumni

Akkineni Ramesh Prasad - 1960 BE Mechanical, director, Prasad Media Corporation, Hyderabad & Prasad Film Laboratories, Chennai
R. Prabhu - 1968 BE Mechanical, former Union Minister of India
Narayanaswamy Balakrishnan - 1972 BE ECE, Indian aerospace and computer scientist, associate director, Indian Institute of Science, Bangalore.
Natarajan Chandrasekaran - 1976 BSc Applied Sciences, current chairman of Tata Sons.
M. J. Xavier - 1976 BTech Chemical, founding director, Indian Institute of Management Ranchi
Subbiah Arunan, Project Director of Mars Orbiter Mission
VB Chandrasekar - 1986 BE Mechanical, former Indian cricket player
Karthik Krishnan - 1995 BE Mechanical, Global CEO, Britannica Group.
S.P. Amrith I.A.S - 2005 BE ECE, District Collector, The Nilgiris (Nov 2021-Incumbent).

References

External links 

 

Colleges affiliated to Anna University
Engineering colleges in Tamil Nadu
Engineering colleges in Coimbatore
Educational institutions established in 1956
1956 establishments in Madras State
Academic institutions formerly affiliated with the University of Madras